Ibirajuba is a city located in the state of Pernambuco, Brazil. Located  at 182 km away from Recife, capital of the state of Pernambuco. Has an estimated (IBGE 2020) population of 7,768 inhabitants.

Geography
 State - Pernambuco
 Region - Agreste Pernambucano
 Boundaries - Altinho and Cachoeirinha   (N);  Lajedo    (S and W);  Panelas and Jurema    (E).
 Area - 189.59 km2
 Elevation - 612 m
 Hydrography - Una River
 Vegetation - Caatinga Hipoxerófila
 Climate - Transition between tropical (Hot and humid)  and, semi arid hot
 Annual average temperature - 22.0 c
 Distance to Recife - 182 km

Economy
The main economic activities in Ibirajuba are based in commerce and agribusiness, especially corn, beans; and livestock such as cattle, sheep, pigs, goats and poultry.

Economic indicators

Economy by Sector
2006

Health indicators

References

Municipalities in Pernambuco